Kristian Blystad (born 18 March 1946) is a Norwegian sculptor.

Career
He was born in Bergen. Among his works is the fountain sculpture Kronos at Majorstuen, Oslo. A granite sculpture of Wilhelm Frimann Koren Christie was erected in front of the Parliament of Norway in 1989. A statue of Christian Frederik was unveiled in front of the Parliament in May 2014.  He also worked on the facade of the new Library of Alexandria. 
He is represented at the National Gallery of Norway and in other galleries in Oslo and Bergen.

His sculpture "26. september - torso" (2008) is located in Oslo at Olav Vs gate 5.

Awards
Blystad was decorated Commander of the Order of St. Olav in 2007. He received  in 2011, shared with Bård Breivik.

References

Further reading

1946 births
Living people
Artists from Bergen
20th-century Norwegian sculptors
21st-century Norwegian sculptors